Mount Fifi was named in 1886 after Edith Orde's dog Fifi. Mount Louis, Mount Edith, and Mount Fifi were named on the trip. It is located in the Sawback range of Banff National Park, Alberta.

Geology

Mount Fifi is composed of limestone, a sedimentary rock laid down from the Precambrian to Jurassic periods. Formed in shallow seas, this sedimentary rock was pushed east and over the top of younger rock during the Laramide orogeny.

Climate

Based on the Köppen climate classification, Mount Fifi is located in a subarctic climate with cold, snowy winters, and mild summers.

See also
List of mountains of Canada
Geology of Alberta

References

Footnotes

External links
 
 National Park Service web site: Banff National Park

Two-thousanders of Alberta
Mountains of Banff National Park